The 27th New York State Legislature, consisting of the New York State Senate and the New York State Assembly, met from January 31 to April 11, 1804, during the third year of George Clinton's second tenure as Governor of New York, in Albany.

Background
Under the provisions of the New York Constitution of 1777, amended by the Constitutional Convention of 1801, 32 Senators were elected on general tickets in the four senatorial districts for four-year terms. They were divided into four classes, and every year eight Senate seats came up for election. Assemblymen were elected countywide on general tickets to a one-year term, the whole assembly being renewed annually.

In 1797, Albany was declared the State capital, and all subsequent Legislatures have been meeting there ever since. In 1799, the Legislature enacted that future Legislatures meet on the last Tuesday of January of each year unless called earlier by the governor.

State Senator Solomon Sutherland died on September 10, 1802, leaving a vacancy in the Middle District.

In 1803, Montgomery County, and two seats were transferred from the Western to the Eastern District.

U.S. Senator DeWitt Clinton resigned on November 4, 1803, after his appointment as Mayor of New York City, and Governor George Clinton appointed John Armstrong to fill the vacancy temporarily.

U.S. Senator Theodorus Bailey resigned on January 16, 1804, after his appointment as Postmaster of New York City.

At this time the politicians were divided into two opposing political parties: the Federalists and the Democratic-Republicans. The Democratic-Republican Party split into two opposing factions at the gubernatorial election of 1804: the "Regulars" who supported Morgan Lewis, and the "Burrites" who supported Vice President Aaron Burr. Lewis had been nominated for Governor by his party, but Burr, after being dropped from the presidential ticket in favor of Gov. George Clinton, ran against Lewis. Burr also received the support of the majority of the Federalists although his enemy Alexander Hamilton, the leader of the Federalists, advocated against it and supported Lewis.

Elections
The State election was held from April 26 to 28, 1803. Senator Edward Savage (Eastern D.) was re-elected. John Broome (Southern D.), Joshua H. Brett, Robert Johnston (both Middle D.), John Tayler and Thomas Tredwell (both Eastern D.); and Assemblymen John Woodworth (Eastern D.) and Caleb Hyde (Western D.) were also elected to full terms in the Senate. Simon Veeder (Eastern D.) and Assemblyman James Burt were elected to fill the vacancies. All ten were Democratic-Republicans.

Sessions
The Legislature met at the Old City Hall in Albany on January 31, 1804; and the Assembly adjourned on April 10, the Senate on April 11.

Dem.-Rep. Alexander Sheldon was elected Speaker.

On February 3, 1804, the Legislature elected two U.S. senators (both Dem.-Rep.): John Armstrong to succeed himself, and John Smith to succeed Theodorus Bailey.

State Senate

Districts
The Southern District (6 seats) consisted of Kings, New York, Queens, Richmond, Suffolk and Westchester counties.
The Middle District (8 seats) consisted of Dutchess, Orange, Ulster, Columbia, Delaware, Rockland and Greene counties.
The Eastern District (9 seats) consisted of Washington, Clinton, Rensselaer, Albany, Saratoga, Essex and Montgomery counties.
The Western District (9 seats) consisted of Herkimer, Ontario, Otsego, Tioga, Onondaga, Schoharie, Steuben, Chenango, Oneida, Cayuga and Genesee counties.

Note: There are now 62 counties in the State of New York. The counties which are not mentioned in this list had not yet been established, or sufficiently organized, the area being included in one or more of the abovementioned counties.

Members
The asterisk (*) denotes members of the previous Legislature who continued in office as members of this Legislature. James Burt, John Woodworth and Caleb Hyde changed from the Assembly to the Senate.

Employees
Clerk: Henry I. Bleecker

State Assembly

Districts

Albany County (6 seats)
Cayuga County (3 seats)
Chenango County (4 seats)
Clinton County (1 seat)
Columbia County (4 seats)
Delaware County (2 seats)
Dutchess County (7 seats)
Essex County (1 seat)
Genesee and Ontario counties (3 seats)
Greene County (2 seats)
Herkimer County (3 seats)
Kings County (1 seat)
Montgomery County (5 seats)
The City and County of New York (9 seats)
Oneida County (4 seats)
Onondaga County (2 seats)
Orange County (4 seats)
Otsego County (4 seats)
Queens County (3 seats)
Rensselaer County (5 seats)
Richmond County (1 seat)
Rockland County (1 seat)
Saratoga County (4 seats)
Schoharie County (2 seats)
Steuben County (1 seat)
Suffolk County (3 seats)
Tioga County (1 seat)
Ulster County (4 seats)
Washington County (6 seats)
Westchester County (4 seats)

Note: There are now 62 counties in the State of New York. The counties which are not mentioned in this list had not yet been established, or sufficiently organized, the area being included in one or more of the abovementioned counties.

Assemblymen
The asterisk (*) denotes members of the previous Legislature who continued as members of this Legislature.

Employees
Clerk: Solomon Southwick
Sergeant-at-Arms: Benjamin Haight
Doorkeeper: Benjamin Whipple

Notes

Sources
The New York Civil List compiled by Franklin Benjamin Hough (Weed, Parsons and Co., 1858) [see pg. 108f for Senate districts; pg. 118f for senators; pg. 148f for Assembly districts; pg. 177 for assemblymen]
The History of Political Parties in the State of New-York, from the Ratification of the Federal Constitution to 1840 by Jabez D. Hammond (4th ed., Vol. 1, H. & E. Phinney, Cooperstown, 1846; pages 202ff)
Election result Assembly, Cayuga Co. at project "A New Nation Votes", compiled by Phil Lampi, hosted by Tufts University Digital Library
Election result Assembly, Columbia Co. at project "A New Nation Votes" [gives wrong party affiliations]
Election result Assembly, Delaware Co. at project "A New Nation Votes"
Election result Assembly, Dutchess Co. at project "A New Nation Votes"
Election result Assembly, Greene Co. at project "A New Nation Votes"
Election result Assembly, Herkimer Co. at project "A New Nation Votes"
Election result Assembly, Montgomery Co. at project "A New Nation Votes"
Election result Assembly, Onondaga Co. at project "A New Nation Votes"
Election result Assembly, Queens Co. at project "A New Nation Votes"
Election result Assembly, Rensselaer Co. at project "A New Nation Votes"
Election result Assembly, Richmond Co. at project "A New Nation Votes"
Election result Assembly, Rockland Co. at project "A New Nation Votes"
Election result Assembly, Schoharie Co. at project "A New Nation Votes"
Election result Assembly, Saratoga Co. at project "A New Nation Votes"
Election result Assembly, Suffolk Co. at project "A New Nation Votes"
Election result Assembly, Tioga Co. at project "A New Nation Votes"
Election result Assembly, Ulster Co. at project "A New Nation Votes"
Election result Assembly, Westchester Co. at project "A New Nation Votes"
Election result Senate, Southern D. at project "A New Nation Votes"
Election result Senate, Middle D. at project "A New Nation Votes"
Election result Senate, Eastern D. at project "A New Nation Votes"
Election result Senate, Western D. at project "A New Nation Votes"

1803 in New York (state)
1804 in New York (state)
027
1803 U.S. legislative sessions